Goran Vujović (Cyrillic: Горан Bуjoвић; born 3 May 1987) is a Montenegrin footballer who plays as forward for FK Kom.

Club career

Early career
He played with FK Teleoptik until 2006 when he signed with FK Banat Zrenjanin playing in the Serbian SuperLiga. He played with Banat for 2 seasons having made 35 league appearances and scored 8 goals.

Videoton
In summer 2008 he moved to Hungary and signed with FC Fehérvár (who changed their name back to Videoton in 2009). After a solid first couple of seasons where he made 37 appearances with 12 goals in the Nemzeti Bajnokság I for the club, in January 2011 he was loaned to another Hungarian top league club, Kecskeméti TE, to help them win the 2010–11 Hungarian Cup although he did not play in the final as it was against his club, Fehérvár. In summer 2011 he was loaned to another club, Szombathelyi Haladás.

Mogren
In the summer 2013 transfer window, after having played a half-season with Lovćen returning from Hungarian football, Vujović joined Mogren. At the time he told a Montenegrin sports portal, CG fudbal, that he accepted Mogren's invitation and thought that Mogren was the best candidate to win the 2013–14 Montenegrin First League. However, by January 2014, Vujović sued Mogren at Montenegro's arbitrage court over unpaid salaries, and told newspaper "Dan" that in addition to not being able to pay salaries, that Mogren didn't even have enough money to fill the team bus with gas; he summarized his spell at Mogren as a "mistake in his career".

Sutjeska
On January 24, 2014, it was announced that Vujović joined Sutjeska Nikšić on a six-month contract. Even playing only a half-season, Vujović contributed to Sutjeska winning the 2013–14 Montenegrin First League with three league goals.

International career
Goran Vujović was a regular player of the Montenegro national under-21 football team during 2007 and 2008. On 6 June 2009, he made his debut for the Montenegro national football team in a match against Cyprus for the 2010 World Cup qualifiers. It remained his only international appearance.

Honours
Videoton
Hungarian Championship: 2010–11
Hungarian League Cup: 2009

Kecskeméti TE
Hungarian Cup: 2010–11

Sutjeska
Montenegrin First League: 2013–14

References

External links
 
 
 Goran Vujović at Footballdatabase

1987 births
Living people
Sportspeople from Cetinje
Association football forwards
Montenegrin footballers
Montenegro international footballers
FK Teleoptik players
FK Banat Zrenjanin players
Fehérvár FC players
Kecskeméti TE players
Szombathelyi Haladás footballers
Egri FC players
FK Lovćen players
FK Mogren players
FK Sutjeska Nikšić players
FC Arsenal Tula players
FK Budućnost Podgorica players
KF Skënderbeu Korçë players
FK Kom players
Serbian SuperLiga players
Nemzeti Bajnokság I players
Montenegrin First League players
Russian First League players
Montenegrin Second League players
Montenegrin expatriate footballers
Expatriate footballers in Serbia
Expatriate footballers in Hungary
Expatriate footballers in Russia
Montenegrin expatriate sportspeople in Serbia
Montenegrin expatriate sportspeople in Hungary
Montenegrin expatriate sportspeople in Russia